Dolly, Dolly, Dolly is the twenty-second solo studio album by American singer-songwriter Dolly Parton. It was released on April 14, 1980, by RCA Victor. The album's two singles, "Starting Over Again" and "Old Flames Can't Hold a Candle to You" both topped the Billboard Hot Country Singles chart. The album peaked at number seven on the Billboard Hot Country LPs chart. The album is generally regarded by critics, as well as Parton's fans, as one of the least satisfying albums of her career, partially due to the fact that it does not include any of her own compositions.

Critical reception
Billboard gave a mixed review of the album, calling it "another set of varied Parton vocals," while noting that Klein's production puts emphasis on piano and percussion. They went on to say that "the frenetic up-tempo songs provide balance in pacing, but Parton's strength remains soft, powerful ballads—the type of song she used to write. Unfortunately, the LP carries no Parton-written songs." They closed by saying that hopefully the lack of songs written by Parton is "only a temporary development in the career of this outstanding writer-performer."

The album received a positive review from Cashbox, saying that "Parton comes out with a very smooth LP in a very slick and classy package." Although, they also noted that Parton "didn’t write a single tune," they felt that "every cut is high quality with a nice mixture of ballads and up tempo numbers." They concluded the review by saying, "There's something for everyone here."

Track listing

Chart performance

Personnel 

Eddie Anderson – drums
Anita Ball – vocals
Jeff Baxter – guitar
George Bohanon – horn
Alexandra Brown – vocals
Lenny Castro - percussion
Steve Cropper – guitar
Nick DeCaro - string & vocal arranger
Denise DeCaro – background vocals & vocal contractor
Frank DeCaro – music contractor
Richard Dennison – vocals
Nathan East – bass guitar
Chuck Findley – horn
Roy Galloway – vocals
Gary Grant – horn
Jay Graydon – guitar
William "Bill" Greene – vocals
Gary Herbig – horn
Jim Horn – horn
Dick Hyde – trombone
Abraham Laboriel – bass guitar
Albert Lee – guitar
Joe McGuffee – guitar
Terry McMillan – harmonica
Gene Morford – vocals
Ron Oates – keyboards
Dolly Parton – vocals
Gregg Perry – piano
Jim Salestrom – vocals
Tom Saviano – horn
Tom Scott – horn
Michael Severs – guitar
Leland Sklar – bass guitar
Buddy Spicher – violin
Stephanie Spruill – vocals
Fred Tackett – guitar
Red Young – keyboards

References

1980 albums
Dolly Parton albums
RCA Records albums
Albums produced by Gary Klein (producer)